Australia's Got Talent is an Australian reality television show, based on the original UK series, to find new talent. Seven Network announced that the show would be returning to their network in 2019 for its ninth season. It had previously aired on Seven for six seasons from 2007 to 2012, and on the Nine Network for two seasons in 2013 and 2016. It had an all new judging panel of Nicole Scherzinger, Shane Jacobson, Manu Feildel & Lucy Durack, and Ricki-Lee Coulter as series host. The season premiered on 28 July 2019.

The semi-final format changed from previous seasons: finalists were decided by a golden buzzer and judges' vote, with no public vote until the final.

The final was on September 22, and the winner was pole dancer Kristy Sellars.

Semi-finalists

Semi-final summary
 Buzzed Out |  |

Semi-final 1 (August 19)

Guest Judge: Jessica Mauboy

Semi-final 2 (August 25)

Guest Judge: Joel Creasey

Semi-final 3 (September 1)

Guest Judge: Hans

Semi-final 4 (September 8)

Guest Judge: Todd McKenney

Semi-final 5 (September 15)

Guest Judge: Natalie Bassingthwaighte

Finals summary 
In the final, the judges chose a top four, which was then chosen by SMS votes from viewers in the eastern states. The final was pre-recorded, with four different endings filmed, one for each of the four possible winners. The winner of the season was pole dancer Kristy Sellars.

The Grand Finale had nine acts because one semi-final golden buzzer act (Captain Ruin) was unavailable.

Guest performers: Samantha Jade, Cosentino

Ratings

References

Australia's Got Talent
2019 Australian television seasons